Slater Walker was a British industrial conglomerate turned bank that got into financial difficulties in the 1970s. It specialised in corporate raids. Its fall shook the British banking system at the time, and it had to be bailed out by the Bank of England after it was unable to refinance its debt during the secondary banking crisis of 1973–75, forcing its founder Jim Slater to quit.

History
In 1964, investor Jim Slater acquired control of H Lotery & Co Ltd, a £1.5m public company, which with his business partner Peter Walker - a Conservative MP - they renamed Slater, Walker Securities. The company performed what became known as corporate raids on public, mainly industrial companies.

Slater Walker then changed strategy, from a corporate-conglomerate into what eventually was recognised as an unauthorised and unlicensed international investment bank, through gradual disposal of its industrial interests.

At its peak, capitalized at over £200 million, the company held deposits totalling £95m, managed £250m of funds and looked after 29,000 pensions. It had grown to be not only a bank but also an investment and insurance empire with stakes in industrial companies.  It had acquired Singapore conglomerate Haw Par Brothers International in 1971 and Dutch investment bank Kempen & Co in 1972 which became its international division.

Collapse
In 1974, it got into financial difficulty after having trouble refinancing its debt during the secondary banking crisis of 1973–75.  By 1975, the problems led to its having to be supported by the Bank of England.

In 1975, the Singapore Government investigated what became known as the Spydar affair, into dealings in a Far East Slater Walker company which resulted in Richard Tarling, the company's sole director, ending up in Changi prison after extradition in 1978. Slater subsequently resigned as Chairman in October 1975, because the Singapore Government began to try to extradite him from the UK for alleged offences by the company in Singapore. In addition an ill-timed attempt to take over Hill Samuel resulted in the loss of city confidence in Slater Walker.

Following the takeover of the company by the Bank of England in 1976, James Goldsmith replaced Slater which caused consternation in the UK government, where the new boss was regarded with as much suspicion as the old:

15 charges were brought against Slater for offences against the Companies Act by the Department of Trade, referring to the alleged misuse of more than £4 million of company funds in share deals. The case, brought by HM Treasury and the Singapore Government, was thrown out in 1977.

In 1979, Slater was charged and convicted on 15 counts under Section 54 of the Companies Act 1948; all related to loans made to affiliated companies for buying stock in the Slater Walker group. He was fined £15 on each charge. Jim Slater became for a time a "minus millionaire" while Peter Walker's political career survived.

Present
The business was subsequently renamed Britannia Arrow. After the purchase of INVESCO and Montagu Investment Management, the company was renamed INVESCO MIM in 1990. (The MIM was later dropped). After a merger with AIM Investments, the company was renamed Amvescap.

References

Defunct banks of the United Kingdom
Financial services companies established in 1964
1975 in the United Kingdom
Financial services companies disestablished in 1975